The Treaty of Brussels was an agreement between representatives of Philip IV of Spain and Charles II, the leader of the exiled royalists of England, Ireland, and Scotland.
It was signed in Brussels, in the Spanish Netherlands, on 2 April 1656. Marquess of Ormonde and the Earl of Rochester signed on behalf of Charles. Alonso de Cárdenas, a former Spanish ambassador to London, signed on behalf of Philip.

Background 

The exiled royalists had been close to the French court, but the 1655 alliance between the Commonwealth of England and the Kingdom of France forced them to leave France and drove them into the arms of Spain. Charles first moved his court to Cologne, then in March 1656 to Brussels. An agreement between Charles II of England and Philip IV of Spain was negociated. It was signed on 2 April (O.S.) or 12 April (N.S.) 1656 for Charles by James Butler, 1st Marquess of Ormond (who later became duke) and Henry Wilmot, 1st Earl of Rochester. It was signed for Philip by Alonso de Cárdenas and the Conde de Fuensaldaña. Philip ratified it on 5 June in Madrid.  This contract in fact updated and extended a similar treaty of 1630.

Terms 

In exchange for future Spanish military support for a potential restoration, Charles agreed to raise forces to fight for Spain in the ongoing Franco-Spanish War (1635–1659). He also pledged to stop English colonisation in the Americas and to return any territory that would be taken by the Commonwealth from Spain. He also agreed to help Spain fight against Portugal's attempt to regain independence.

Aftermath 

In 1657, the Commonwealth signed the Treaty of Paris with France, which formalised the developing Anglo-French alliance. Charles's alliance with the nation's traditional enemy, Spain, further undermined his support with the English public.

Nonetheless, royalist supporters joined the Royalist Army in Exile in significant numbers, led by his younger brother James, Duke of York. Large numbers of Irish troops deserted from the French army to serve under the Duke of York in the hope that they could invade England. However, their hopes were largely dashed by the Spanish defeat to Anglo-French forces at the 1658 Battle of the Dunes and the surrender of Dunkirk.

Spain then made peace with France at the Treaty of the Pyrenees in 1659, and even the death of Oliver Cromwell did not lead to the immediate collapse of the Commonwealth.

In 1660, Charles was restored to the crown with the assistance of English troops of the New Model Army, under George Monck. The failure of Spain, however, to assist Charles' return to London meant that he did not feel bound by the treaty and so he annulled it.

Under Charles, English settlement in the Americas continued to grow. In 1662, he made a dynastic marriage with the Portuguese Catharine of Braganza and supported Portugal's successful campaign for independence. The territory that was taken by England from Spain before 1660 was either kept or sold. Jamaica was turned into an English colony, and Charles sold Dunkirk to his cousin Louis XIV.

References

Sources 

  – (Snippet view)
  – (Preview)
 
  – 1655 to 1657

 
 

1656 in the Habsburg Netherlands
17th-century diplomatic conferences
1656 treaties
17th century in Brussels
Treaties of the Spanish Empire
Philip IV of Spain
Charles II of England
England–Spain relations